Constraint in information theory is the degree of statistical dependence between or among variables.

Garner provides a thorough discussion of various forms of constraint (internal constraint, external constraint, total constraint) with application to pattern recognition and psychology.

See also
 Mutual Information
 Total Correlation
 Interaction information

References

Information theory